Ueleni Fono (born May 6, 1982) is a Tongan rugby player who plays as an openside flanker and as an eighthman for French club Blagnac SCR. He played for Stade Aurillacois Cantal Auvergne from 2006-2008.

In July 2013 he moved to Biarritz. In February 2016 he suffered a hamstring injury, forcing him to miss several games.

In October 2016 he announced that he was ending his professional career with Biarritz and was instead joining Blagnac SCR.

References

1982 births
Living people
Tonga international rugby union players
SU Agen Lot-et-Garonne players
Tongan expatriate rugby union players
Expatriate rugby union players in France
Tongan expatriate sportspeople in France
People from Haʻapai
Rugby union flankers